List of members of the Senate for the 78th West Virginia Legislature

Leadership of the 78th West Virginia Senate

Members of the 78th West Virginia Senate

Composition of the 78th West Virginia Senate

2007–2009:

See also 
West Virginia Senate
List of presidents of the West Virginia Senate
List of members of the 77th West Virginia Senate
List of members of the 79th West Virginia Senate

External links 
West Virginia Legislature Homepage
Senate District Map

West Virginia Senate 78th
West Virginia legislative sessions
2007 U.S. legislative sessions
2008 U.S. legislative sessions
78